Wolf-Ruebeling House was a historic home near Defiance, St. Charles County, Missouri. It was built between about 1857 and 1859, and was a two-story, vernacular style brick I-house with Classical Revival style design references. It was destroyed in a 1985 fire.

It was added to the National Register of Historic Places in 1983 and delisted in 1994.

References

Former National Register of Historic Places in Missouri
Houses on the National Register of Historic Places in Missouri
Houses completed in 1859
Buildings and structures in St. Charles County, Missouri
National Register of Historic Places in St. Charles County, Missouri